Arthur Warren Jack Cumming (8 May 1889 – 9 May 1914) was a British figure skater. He came in second of the three participants in the special figures event at the 1908 Summer Olympics, earning him a silver medal. This was the only year in which special figures was an Olympic event.  Cumming also participated in pair skating with partner Mrs. Arthur Cadogan.  They placed 7th at the World Championships in 1912 and 1913.
Cumming was involved in a motorcycle accident in May 1914 after which he contracted tetanus and died.

Results

Men's singles

Pairs
(with Mrs. Arthur Cadogan)

Special Figures

References

External links
 Figure skating: The Early Years up to 1914
 World Figure Skating Championships 1908-1914
 

1889 births
1914 deaths
British male single skaters
British male pair skaters
Olympic figure skaters of Great Britain
Olympic silver medallists for Great Britain
Olympic medalists in figure skating
Figure skaters at the 1908 Summer Olympics
Medalists at the 1908 Summer Olympics
Motorcycle road incident deaths
Road incident deaths in England
Deaths from tetanus